Denise Sofía Rosenthal Schalchli (born 8 November 1990), known professionally as Denise Rosenthal is a Chilean singer, songwriter, and actress.

Early life
Rosenthal was born in Santiago, Chile. She has two brothers, one sister, and is the youngest of four children. Her mother, Liselotte, is an industrial designer, and her father, Christian, works in ceramics. When Rosenthal was eight years old, her parents separated. She studied at Santiago College, a  bi-lingual private school in Providencia, Santiago, Chile. While attending school, Rosenthal stated she was bullied because her family was not wealthy. Rosenthal currently lives in Santiago.

Acting career
In 2006, Rosenthal began her television career as a member of the successful Canal 13 Chilean tween musical series, Amango, playing "Maria Fernanda Mc Gellar" better known as "Feña". The series premiered on  June 16, 2007, and ended on September 1, 2007. In Amango, Rosenthal participated also as one of the members of the telenovela's pop group of the same name. The band  successfully released three albums with the music used in the show.

The second season of Amango began filming at the end of 2007. It premiered on March 28, 2008, and ended in  June  2008. Rosenthal also filmed  Amango: The Tour in 2008. This documentary featured the cast members of "Amango" as they prepared and promoted the series while on a national tour throughout Chile. Following the success of her participation in Amango, Canal 13 commissioned a spin-off series called El Blog de la Feña. Rosenthal reprised her role as "Feña"; the program allowed viewers to vote for the next storyline using text message voting. It was released in June 2008 and received high ratings on Canal 13 in 2 timeslots.

In 2009, Rosenthal portrayed Martina Valdivieso Rey in Corazón Rebelde, the Chilean remake of the popular 2002 Argentine telenovela, Rebelde Way. Rosenthal also took part in the telenovela's spin-off band, CRZ: Corazón Rebelde. In 2010, she travelled to Buenos Aires, Argentina to study acting, dance and voice for six months. She returned to Santiago following the conclusion of her classes. Rosenthal made her film debut in the comedy-drama, El Limpiapiscinas in July 2011.

At the end of 2011, she began filming for two acting projects. The film, El Babysitter, was released in cinemas in Chile on January 24, 2013. In April 2012, Rosenthal made her theatre debut as Paz in the Chilean Broadway-style musical, Que Cante La Vida. Performances began on June 7, 2012, at Teatro Municipal de Las Condes in Santiago, Chile.

In April 2013, after taking a four-year break from television projects as a protagonist, Rosenthal announced that she had been cast as "Jessica Lorca", a character in the web page of Chilean television network MEGA's and  newest program, Chico reality. Filming for the television series began in Chile on April 22, 2013. The series is expected to air sometime in 2014.

At the end of 2011 and for part of the 2012, Rosenthal also participated in the teen television series, El Nuevo, for TVN in Chile. Although filmed in 2011, the television series, El Nuevo aired special preview on July 4, 2013, for TVN in Chile. The program began airing Monday through Friday on July 8, 2013, and finish on July 26, 2013, for TVN in Chile. Two ages after, Rosenthal acting in the telenovela of TVN, Matriarcas in the role of Sandra Bravo Peñaloza. In January 2016, Rosenthal made her theatre as Princesa Jazz in the Mall Plaza's Chilean musical Aladino, el musical, based on the Disney's movie Aladdín.

Music career

Early career and telenovela soundtracks (2008-2010)
Rosenthal showed an interest in music at a young age. She recorded her first CD consisting of four songs called Renacer in 2006, but it was never released to the public. Rosenthal participated in the Amango and Amango 2 soundtracks in 2007 and 2008, as well as a Christmas album called Amango: Villancicos. In June 2008, Rosenthal released her first solo single, "No Quiero Escuchar Tu Voz", as part of the promotion for her TV series El Blog de la Feña; the song reached number 8 in Top 100 Chile.

At the end of 2010, following the completion of her role in the Chilean telenovela Corazón Rebelde and the band CRZ: Corazón Rebelde, Rosenthal  began working on her first solo album, featuring music of her own composition.

Solo career and debut album (2011-2015)
In May 2011, Rosenthal released her solo promotional single, "Men", a controversial cover version of Gladys Knight's 1991 single. In November of the same year, Rosenthal released her first single, "I Wanna Give My Heart". The lyrics were written by Rosenthal and composed by Neven Ilic. On May 18, 2012, Rosenthal's second official single, "Just Better Alone", was premiered online in Chile by La Tercera.cl.

In September 2012, Rosenthal released her third official single, "Dance" featuring the Chilean hip-hop group Crossfire. The single was written by Rosenthal. In March 2013, Rosenthal announced that her first album as a solo artist was expected to be released in Chile sometime in April. She revealed that the album is a mixture of urban, pop and R&B influences.

Rosenthal released her debut album, Fiesta, on November 6, 2013. Rosenthal released her album under the stage name "D-Niss". The album contains 11 "Spanglish" songs written or co-written by Rosenthal. Physical copies were available exclusively for FeriaMix Santagio in Chile. The album was released digitally on iTunes on November 8, 2013, for the United States and Chile. The album is available to stream for free on Rosenthal's official SoundCloud account. Rosenthal worked on the album for eight months in Santiago, Chile.

In May 2014, Rosenthal announced that the fifth single from her solo album would be "Revolution". She partially filmed a music video for the single in Santiago later that month. After she suffered a neck injury in minor car accident, production was delayed. After spending a few weeks to recover, Rosenthal completed production on the music video in July 2014. To promote the single, Rosenthal surprised fans by  performing at a metro station in Santiago with a flash mob of 30 dancers. The controversial music video for "Revolution" was released following an exclusive live acoustic concert, which streamed online for Movistar Chile, on August 18, 2014.

Second album Cambio de Piel (2015-present) 
The album Cambio de Piel was released on December 6, 2017. "Cambio de Piel" was released as the album's lead-single on November 25, 2016. Its music video, was released on December 6, 2016. The second single, "Isidora" was released on September 1, 2017. Its music video, was released on August 31, 2017. It was directed by Claudia Huaiquimilla. The other songs released were "Cabello de Ángel" on January 25, 2018. A music video was released on the same day and shows the singer dancing in different places and singing in front of a blue background wearing a flower crown, "Lucha en Equilibrio" and "Encadená".

On February 14, 2019, Rosenthal performed "Soñar de a Dos", alongside Camilo Zicavo. Five months later, on July 13, 2019, she released a song called "Agua Segura", with Spanish Mala Rodríguez. She followed this with the singles "El Amor no Duele" on August 22, "Ni un fruto" on November 28, and "Tiene Sabor" on February 20, 2020. In February 2020, Denise won the Silver and Golden Seagull after their presentation in Viña del Mar International Song Festival.

Filmography

Television

Film

Theatre

Discography

Solo artist

Singles
As lead artist

As featured artist

Other charted songs

Soundtracks

With El Blog de la Feña

With Amango

With CRZ

References

External links 

Denise Rosenthal official web site
 
 

1990 births
Living people
Chilean actresses
21st-century Chilean women singers
People from Santiago
Chilean people of German-Jewish descent
Chilean Jews
Chilean LGBT rights activists
Chilean child singers